Psychroglaciecola arctica  is a Gram-negative, facultatively methylotrophic, aerobic and motile bacterium from the genus Psychroglaciecola with a single polar flagellum which has been isolated from soil from glacial foreland near Ny-Ålesund in Norway.

References 

Hyphomicrobiales
Bacteria described in 2014